San Sai, Mae Chan is a village and tambon (subdistrict) of Mae Chan District, in Chiang Rai Province, Thailand. In 2005 it had a population of 2,419 people. The tambon contains nine villages.

References

Tambon of Chiang Rai province
Populated places in Chiang Rai province